Hume MRT station is a future underground Mass Rapid Transit station located along the junction of Hume Ave and Upper Bukit Timah Road. It is an infill station and will be located near a number of Bukit Timah heritage sites: Bukit Timah Hill, Bukit Timah Nature Reserve, Former Bukit Timah Fire Station, Fuyong Estate, and Former Ford Factory. The station will have two platforms and will be between Beauty World and Hillview stations on the Downtown Line.

The new station is planned to open by 2025, but MP Low Yen Ling has mentioned that construction work could start in the fourth quarter of 2020, with a veteran MRT contractor claiming that retrofitting of the station for operational service could take between "one and one-and-a-half years". Construction of the station began on 28 February 2021.

History

Hume station was initially built as a 'shell station' together with the second phase of the Downtown Line, which opened in 2015. As the projected ridership for the station was deemed insufficient, the station was not opened at that time.

On 7 March 2019, the station was announced during a parliamentary debate, and is planned to be open by 2025. The redevelopment of the Rail Corridor, along with the future transformation of the former Bukit Timah Fire Station into a recreational node, were stated as reasons that would increase potential ridership and justify the opening of the station.

The contract for the design and construction of Hume MRT Station and associated tunnels was awarded to JSM Construction Group Pte Ltd at a sum of S$34.338 million (US$ million) on 14 January 2021. The contract includes the construction of a station entrance, ventilation shaft and fitting-out works for the new station. The station was targeted to be completed in 2025. Construction works started on 28 February 2021 with MP Low Yen Ling and Health Minister Gan Kim Yong in attendance. Most of the works will be conducted at night as the station is constructed on the operational DTL.

References

Bukit Timah
Mass Rapid Transit (Singapore) stations
Proposed railway stations in Singapore